Rudolf Ernst Paul Schündler (17 April 1906, in Leipzig – 12 December 1988, in Munich) was a German actor and director. He played "Karl" in The Exorcist (1973).

After finishing the film The Nasty Girl, Schündler died of a heart attack in Germany, aged 82. The film was released in 1990, two years after his death.

Filmography

Director 
  The Violin Maker of Mittenwald (1950)
 Victoria and Her Hussar (1954)
 The Faithful Hussar (1954)
  The Happy Village (1955)
  The Beautiful Master (1956)
 Greetings and Kisses from Tegernsee  (1957)
 Mikosch, the Pride of the Company
  (1958)
  Gräfin Mariza (1958)
   (1959)
  Willy the Private Detective (1960)
  (1961)
 Café Oriental (1962)
  Wild Water (1962)

Actor 

1924: Roulette as Reginald
1930: Only on the Rhine
1932: Annemarie, die Braut der Kompanie as Leutnant Williams
1933: The Testament of Dr. Mabuse as Hardy
1935: Hundert Tage as Gaillard
1935: Joan of Arc
1936: Savoy Hotel 217 as Geschäftsführer des 'Savoy'
1936: Moscow-Shanghai as Galgenvogel
1936:  as Rundfunk-Reporter
1936: Romance as Hartwig – Sekretär
1937: Ride to Freedom, as Polnischer Student
1937: Heiratsinstitut Ida und Co as Peter – Riedingers Neffe
1937: Das Schweigen im Walde as Martin, Diener
1937: Gewitterflug zu Claudia as Kloemkes – Bordfunker
1938: Mit versiegelter Order as Holzmann – Legationsrat
1938: The Stars Shine as Versicherungsmann
1938: The Woman at the Crossroads as Graup
1938: By a Silken Thread as Von Tettenboom
1938: Scheidungsreise as Young Lawyer
1938: Napoleon Is to Blame for Everything as Rundfunkreporter
1938: Dreizehn Mann und eine Kanone
1939: Verliebtes Abenteuer as Sekretär des Polizeipräsidenten
1939: The Green Emperor (uncredited)
1939: Ich verweigere die Aussage
1939: Robert and Bertram as Gäst bei Ipelmeyer
1939: Woman Without a Past as Kriminalassistent Semmler
1939: Bachelor's Paradise as Lawyer (uncredited)
1939: Kitty and the World Conference as Rundfunkreporter
1939: Die goldene Maske as Olden
1939: Alarm at Station III as Inspektor Henning
1939: Hurrah! I'm a Father as Freund von Peter
1939: Der Stammbaum des Dr. Pistorius as Freiherr von Bekker
1939: Verdacht auf Ursula as Gast bei Tweels
1940: Weißer Flieder as Max Mohr, Reklamezeichner bei Rössler
1940: Tip auf Amalie as Herr Schmitz
1940: Golowin geht durch die Stadt as Jüngling
1940: Meine Tochter tut das nicht
1940: Herz ohne Heimat as Peter Brack
1940: Achtung! Feind hört mit as Zeichner Herbert Grelling
1940: Kleider machen Leute as Konfektionshändler Melcher-Böhni in Goldach
1940: Der Herr im Haus as Ferdinand von Schwarzendorff
1941: Alarm as Produzent des Werbefilms
1941: The Swedish Nightingale
1941: Riding for Germany as Generaldirektor Brenner
1941: Immer nur Du as Komponist
1941: Sechs Tage Heimaturlaub as Schütze, Graphologe im Zivilberuf
1942: Sein Sohn as Der 'Elegante' Juwelendieb und Einbrecher
1942: Das große Spiel as Kretschmann
1942: Front Theatre  as Walter Hülsen
1942: With the Eyes of a Woman as Werner
1943: Ein Walzer mit dir as Schmalfuß, Angestellter im Furioso-Verlag
1943: Love Premiere as Der Regisseur
1943: The Eternal Tone as Schneidermeister
1943: Circus Renz as Litfaß
1943: Kollege kommt gleich as Ein entfernter Verwandter von Lilo
1943: A Man With Principles? as Peter Ordner, der "Verlobte" Christls
1944: Die Hochstaplerin as Junger Mann
1944: Ein schöner Tag
1944: Das schwarze Schaf
1944: Ich hab von Dir geträumt
1945: Zimmer zu vermieten
1945: Leuchtende Schatten
1945: Der Fall Molander
1945: Das Mädchen Juanita (uncredited)
1948:  as Oskar
1949: Tromba
1949: Nothing But Coincidence as Polizeikommissar
1949:  as Herr Stock
1949:  as Dr. Roedel
1950: Royal Children as Tintsch
1950: One Night Apart as Tobias Nickelmann
1950: Who Is This That I Love? as Stefan
1950: Vier Treppen rechts as Rudi
1950: Love on Ice as Dr. Siegfried Bergmann
1950: Theodore the Goalkeeper as Choleriker
1950: Sensation im Savoy as Hotelportier
1950: Kissing Is No Sin
1950: Die Sterne lügen nicht as Der Journalist unterm Regenschirm
1951: Begierde
1951: Das späte Mädchen
1951: Eyes of Love as Dr. Bertram
1951: The Lady in Black as Polizeiinspektor Polter
1951: In München steht ein Hofbräuhaus as Gottlieb Bömmchen
1952: House of Life as Dr. Blümel
1952: The Blue and White Lion as Herr von Kleewitz
1952: We're Dancing on the Rainbow as Kriminalassistent
1953: Captain Bay-Bay as Wüllmann
1953: Marriage for One Night as Turnegger
1953: Mask in Blue as Inspizient
1953: When The Village Music Plays on Sunday Nights
1953: Heute Nacht passiert's as Steuerberater Pagel
1953: The Last Waltz as Jerome Thibaut
1955: Wenn der Vater mit dem Sohne as Herr im Laden
1956: IA in Oberbayern as Detektiv
1961: Isola Bella as Dr. Bergmann
1963: Hochzeit am Neusiedler See as Emanuel Paulini
1964: Legend of a Gunfighter as Rufus Harper
1964:  as Prof. Krusius
1965: Der unheimliche Mönch as Alfons Short
1965:  as Schützenkönig
1965: Aunt Frieda as Onkel Rudolf Waschkühn
1966: Sperrbezirk as Klipitzki
1966:  as Doktorchen
1966: Long Legs, Long Fingers as Inspektor
1966: 
1966: Onkel Filser – Allerneueste Lausbubengeschichten as Professor Liebrecht Mutius
1967: Treibgut der Großstadt as Willi, Bargast
1967: The Monk with the Whip as Sergeant Hanfield
1967: 
1967:  as Hauptmann
1967: When Night Falls on the Reeperbahn as Direktor Hanns Henningsen
1968: Die Lümmel von der ersten Bank, 1. Teil: Zur Hölle mit den Paukern as Dr. Knörz
1968: The Moment to Kill as Warren
1968:  as Prosecutor
1968: Die Lümmel von der ersten Bank, 2. Teil: Zum Teufel mit der Penne as Oberstudienrat Arthur Knörz
1968:  (TV miniseries) as Kriminalkommissar
1969: The Man with the Glass Eye as Nuthacher
1969: Der Kommissar – Season 1, Episode 5: "Ein Mädchen meldet sich nicht mehr" (TV) as Karl Däubele
1969:  as Dr. Krapp-Krapproth
1969: Charley's Uncle as Dr. Bruhn
1969: Die Lümmel von der ersten Bank, 3. Teil:  as Dr. Arthur Knörz
1969: Heintje: A Heart Goes on a Journey as Rektor Neumann
1969:  as Wolfram Kent
1969: Die Lümmel von der ersten Bank, 4. Teil: Hurra, die Schule brennt! as Studienrat Dr. Knörz
1970: Frau Wirtin bläst auch gern Trompete as Physikus
1970: Gentlemen in White Vests as Diplomingenieur Willy Stademann
1970:  as Lawyer Schiller
1970: Hotel by the Hour as Oskar Jennewein
1970:  as Dalfour
1970: Die Lümmel von der ersten Bank, 5. Teil: Wir hau’n die Pauker in die Pfanne as Studienrat Dr. Knörz
1970: What Is the Matter with Willi? as Fridolin
1970:  as Lorenzen
1970: Die Feuerzangenbowle as Musiklehrer
1970: Frau Wirtin treibt es jetzt noch toller
1970:  as Onkel Emmanuel
1971: Twenty Girls and the Teachers as Onkel Theobald
1971: Aunt Trude from Buxtehude as Notary
1971:  as Dr. Möbius
1971: Die Lümmel von der ersten Bank, 6. Teil: Morgen fällt die Schule aus as Studienrat Dr. Knörz
1971: Our Willi Is the Best as Ottokar Mümmelmann
1971: Das ehrliche Interview as Theissen
1971:  as Onkel Troll
1971:  as Dagobert von Kattnig
1972: Die Lümmel von der ersten Bank, 7. Teil: , as Oberstudienrat Dr. Arthur Knörz
1972: Tatort:  (TV) as Kommissar Göbel
1972: The Red Queen Kills Seven Times as Tobias Wildenbrück
1972: Nya hyss av Emil i Lönneberga as Borgmästaren
1973: The Twins from Immenhof as Lehrer Zwilling
1973: The Exorcist as Karl Engstrom
1974: When Mother Went on Strike as Pastor Hans
1974:  as Father Conrad
1974: Karl May as Kreutzmann
1975: Derrick – Season 2, Episode 5: "Zeichen der Gewalt" (TV) as Max Tolpe
1975:  (TV miniseries) as Molchow
1976: Kings of the Road as Robert's Father
1976: Tatort:  (TV) as Schürmann sen.
1976:  as Vondenbäumen
1977: Suspiria as Prof. Milius
1977:  as Obdachloser
1977: Derrick – Season 4, Episode 4: "Offene Rechnung" (TV) as Willi Nell
1977: Group Portrait with a Lady as Otto Hoyser
1977: The American Friend as Gantner
1977: The Expulsion from Paradise as Guest appearance
1978: Derrick – Season 5, Episode 3: "Abendfrieden" (TV) as Waldemar Kreuzer
1978:  (TV series) as Stoffhändler Felten
1978:  (TV series) as Hubertus Conradi
1978: The Man in the Rushes as Pfarrer
1978: Just a Gigolo as Oberst Gustav von Przygodski
1979: Flamme empor (TV film)
1979: Derrick – Season 6, Episode 7: "Lena" (TV) as Kunsthändler
1979: Aktion Abendsonne (TV film)
1979:  (TV film)
1979: The Old Fox – Season 3, Episode 11: "Eine große Familie" (TV) as Dr. Pistralek
1979:  (TV series) as Der Älteste
1980: Un-Ruhestand – Episode 4: "Baldauf" (TV)
1980: The Old Fox – Season 4, Episode 4: "Die tote Hand" (TV) as Alois Bettler
1981: The Old Fox – Season 5, Episode 1: "Freispruch" (TV) as Herr Berthold
1981: Sternensommer (TV series) as Lodeweik
1982: Tatort:  (TV) as Vater Henschel
1982: The Old Fox – Season 6, Episode 4: "Hass" (TV) as Butler Georg
1982: The Old Fox – Season 6, Episode 9: "Ich werde dich töten" (TV) as Walter Falk
1983: Das Traumschiff – Episode 10 (TV) as Karl Krause
1983: Der Sandmann (TV film)
1983: Rote Erde (TV series) as Hermann Rewandowski
1984: Mabuse im Gedächtnis (Short)
1987: Der Unsichtbare as Onkel Josef
1987: Ätherrausch
1990: The Nasty Girl as The archivist (final film role)

External links 
 

1906 births
1988 deaths
German male film actors
German film directors
Film people from Leipzig
Burials at the Ostfriedhof (Munich)
German male silent film actors
German male television actors
20th-century German male actors